A toll road is a road over which users may travel over on payment of a toll, or fee. Tolls are a form of use tax that pays for the cost of road construction and maintenance, without raising taxes on non-users. Investor's bonds necessary for the construction of the roads are issued and sold with the expectation that the bonds will be paid back with user tolls. The toll roads may be run by government agencies that have bond issuing authority and/or private companies that sell bonds or have other sources of finance. Toll roads are usually a government guaranteed road monopoly that guarantees limited or no competing roads will be built by government agencies for the duration of the bonds. Private toll roads built with money raised from private investors in expectation of making money from the tolls probably dominated early toll roads. Government sponsored toll roads often guarantee a minimum payment (from other taxes) to the bond holders if traffic volume and toll collections are less than predicted. If the toll authority is a private company there is often a maximum amount of fees that they may extract from users. Toll road operators are typically responsible for maintaining the roads. After the bonds are paid off the road typically reverts to the government agency that authorized the road and owns the land it was built on. Like most government taxes it is not unusual for tolls to continue to be charged after the bonds have been paid off.

History 
Many modern European roads were originally constructed as toll roads in order to bring in the costs of construction. Tolls on roads and bridges were very common in England in the 12th century and in the 15th century, schemes for improving particular roads or rivers were granted by acts of Parliament that authorised justices to levy rates for the repair of certain roads. In 1706, a new concept of road tolls was introduced in England: the turnpike trusts. The turnpike trusts were authorised to erect gates, collect tolls, appoint surveyors and collectors, demand statute labour or its monetary equivalent, mortgage the tolls, elect new trustees, and undertake work necessary for repairing the roads. By 1750, most of the main roads between London and the provincial centres and some inter-provincial routes had been turnpiked. By the mid-1830s, over 1000 turnpike trusts controlled 35,000 km of main roads and disposed about 1.5 million pounds of toll receipts each year. However, the rise of railway transport largely halted the road improving schemes of the turnpike trusts, and from the 1870s, the Parliament stopped renewing the acts and roads began to revert to local authorities; toll roads passed out of fashion until the later 19th century.

In the 20th century, road tolls have been introduced for financing the construction of motorway networks and specific road infrastructure such as bridges and tunnels. Italy has been the first European country to apply the use of motorway tolls on a 50 km motorway section near Milan in 1924. It was followed by Greece, which made users to pay for the network of motorways around and between its cities in 1927. Later in the 1950s and 1960s, also France, Spain and Portugal started to build motorways largely with the aid of concessions, allowing rapid development of this infrastructure without massive State debts. Since then, road tolls have been introduced in the majority of the EU Member States.

Road tolling has been a topic on the European Community level since the 1960s, when the Council published the Council Decision No. 64/389/EEC in order to collect data to serve as a basis for the establishment of a system of charging for the use of infrastructure under the common transport policy.

However, the focus of the European Commission has rather been on lorries than on private cars, as lorries are concerned directly by the internal market. But it was only in the end of the last century, that the legal basis for road tolling was established in Directive 1999/62/EC ("Eurovignette") on European Community level. This Directive had the focus on the tolling of motorways, bridges, tunnels and mountain passes, but only for lorries over 12 tonnes maximum laden weight, and the charging was only possible for infrastructure costs. Eight years later in 2006, the Directive was amended by Directive 2006/38/EC, which has a new focus on road tolling of the trans-European road network, but leaves the EU Member States the right to apply tolls as well on roads not included in the trans-European road network. The amended Directive gives the EU Member States the possibility of varying tolls according to a number of factors such as distance travelled, place, infrastructure type and speed, vehicle characteristics, time of day and congestion level. In addition, the EU Member States are obliged to include all vehicles over 3.5 tonnes maximum laden weight after 2012, and after 2010, the tolls must be differentiated according to the environmental performance of the vehicle.
Recently, the European Commission proposed a new, second amendment to the Directive 1999/62/EC, enabling EU Member States to integrate the cost of air and noise pollution caused by traffic in tolls levied on heavy goods vehicles and allowing tolls to be calculated on the basis of the cost of congestion imposed upon other vehicles during peak periods.

Specialised system provisions

Toll stickers 

Several European countries have toll road payment done in the form of toll stickers affixed to the car's front window, which are valid for a certain amount of time.

Toll collection for lorries 
 Switzerland introduced a toll-system for HGVs over 3.5 tonnes in January 2001, and
 Austria introduced an electronic toll collection system for lorries over 3.5 tonnes in January 2004, based on DSRC micro wave technology.
 Germany followed suit with a toll system for lorries over 12 tonnes, with some delay due to organisational and technical problems on 1 January 2005.  The German Toll Collect system is based on a technology using satellites; lorry operators may choose to either install on-board units for automated tracking of movements, or to book their route in advance using the internet or computerised booking terminals. The toll is valid for lorries or HGVs over 12 tonnes. On 1 October 2015, the toll will be extended to lorries over 7.5 tonnes.
 Hungary installed the e-toll system for lorries over 3.5 tonnes on 1 July 2013.
 Lithuanian highways A1-A18 have a toll system for all vans, lorries and buses.
 On 1 July 2014, Latvia introduced a toll system for all lorries over 3.5 tons on highways A1-A15.

Particular countries

Austria 
As of 2017, a twelve-month sticker for private cars and motorhomes up to 3.5t is EURO 86.40 and for motorcycles EURO 34.40. A two-month sticker for private cars and motorhomes up to 3.5t is EURO 25.90 and for motorcycles EURO 13.00. A 10-day sticker for private cars and motorhomes up to 3.5t is EURO 8.90 and for motorcycles EURO 5.10.

Belarus 

Major highways in Belarus are toll roads with Open road tolling (ORT) or free-flow tolling. BelToll is an electronic toll collection system (ETC), valid from 1 July 2013 in the Republic of Belarus.

Bulgaria 
All vehicles using roads in Bulgaria must have a vignette sticker. It is obligatory for almost all national roads in Bulgaria, not only for highways.
2017 Price for annual sticker (valid from Jan 1 to Jan 31 next year regardless date of purchase) for vehicles under 3.5 t is 97 BGN. There's stickers for a month (30 BGN) and for a week (15 BGN).

In April 2016 Bulgaria launched a tender for implementation of an electronic toll collection system for vehicles heavier than 3.5 tonnes for all roads.

Czech Republic 
2017 prices for vehicles under 3.5 tonnes:

Annual (R): CZK 1,500	Starts on December 1, 2016 and expires on January 31, 2018 (1 month before and after the nominal period).

Month (M): CZK 440	Starts on the day marked on the sticker and expires at the end of the same day as marked on the sticker in the immediately following month.

10-day (D): CZK 310	Starts on the day marked on the sticker and expires at the end of the tenth calendar day.

Croatia 

Croatian motorways are generally toll roads and most of these use networked closed toll collection system, meaning the driver receives a ticket upon entering the network and pays the toll upon exiting. Toll is paid in proportion to the length of the used section and according to the corresponding vehicle group. The first motorway, today's A1 section between Zagreb and Karlovac, was opened in 1972. As a cash and credit card alternative, all highway concession companies offer paying the toll via electronic toll collection (ETC) or Smart card prepaid toll card.

Croatia also has a considerable network of other motorways, including some grade-separated expressways and major state routes, but they are by and large not tolled.

Denmark 

The Great Belt Fixed Link the Øresund Bridge and Fjord Link Frederikssund (Crown Princess Mary's Bridge) are toll roads.

In the Faroe Islands, the inter-island road tunnels Vágatunnilin and Norðoyatunnilin both have tolls (but no physical toll booths are present and the toll must be paid at nearby petrol stations).

Finland 
In Finland there are no toll roads or toll bridges, which is mainly because constructing and maintaining roads is funded by Finnish taxes.

France

Germany 
Autobahns are totally free (Court of Justice of the European Union verdict).

Greece 
Greece has 2133 kilometers  of motorway toll roads:
Attiki Odos
Moreas
Αegean Motorway
Nea Odos
Kentriki Odos
Egnatia Odos
"Charilaos Trikoupis" Rion-Antirion Bridge.

Hungary 

In Hungary every motorway is a toll road, administered by the National Toll Payment Services (NÚSZ Zrt.). The roads M0 (that forms a half ring around the city of Budapest), M2 and M15 although are divided multilane roads, most sections can be used only with a sticker. A detailed map is available, showing toll roads in red and toll-exempt sections of the motorway network.

Since the beginning of 2008, the purchase of a motorway sticker is handled electronically (known as an "e-sticker" or e-matrica), thus cannot be put physically on the windshield anymore, it is only registered in a computer system with its validity period. The highway cameras are checking the registered plate number and not the sticker itself. The 10 days, monthly and yearly stickers can be used for unlimited trips on every highway, within its validity period.

The highway stickers can be purchased or registered online or at petrol stations (gas stations) all around the country. The purchase receipts should be kept for at least half a year after the trip.

Iceland 
The Hvalfjörður Tunnel was once tolled, but is toll free as of 28 September 2018.

Ireland 
In Ireland there are eleven tolled road-transport schemes, operated by various independent operators. The majority of these are tolls on a major bridge or tunnel on the route. All tolled roads in the Republic were built under a public-private partnership system, giving the company which arranged for the road to be built the right to collect tolls for a defined period. Tolls vary from €1.65 to €12 for cars. Larger vehicles pay more, with the exception of the Dublin Port Tunnel, where buses and heavy goods vehicles travel toll-free.

Tolled road segments are:
M3 motorway - on-line Toll between Junction 5 and  Junction 6 (11 km); and between Junction 9 and Junction 10 (11 km) 
M4 motorway - On-line toll-gate between Junction 8 and Junction 10 (28.5 km)
M6 motorway - on-line Toll between Junction 15 and Junction 16 (26.5 km)
M7/M8 motorway M7/M8 interchange - on-line Toll between Junction 18 and Junction 21 (27 km) / Junction 3 on the M8 and Junction 18 (23 km)

The toll charged remains the same irrespective of the distance travelled up to the tolling point — there is no lower price for using only part of the road.

In addition, the following major bridges and tunnels (and their approaches) are tolled: 
M1 Motorway Mary McAleese Boyne Valley Bridge - Between Junction 7 and Junction 10 (15 km)
M8 motorway Blackwater crossing - Between Junction 15 and Junction 17 (13 km)
N25 Waterford city bypass, Suir River Bridge - Between junction with M9/N24 and junction with R710 (3 km)
Limerick Tunnel - Between Junction 2 and Junction 4 on the N18 Road (6 km)
East-Link Bridge, Dublin.
Dublin Port Tunnel (M50 Motorway, Dublin)
West-Link Bridge (M50 Motorway, Dublin) Liffey valley crossing - Between Junction 6 and Junction 7 (4 km)

Italy 
In Italy most autostrade (the Italian for motorways, or freeways) are toll roads. Major exceptions are the beltways around some larger cities (tangenziali) which are not part of a thoroughfare motorway, and the section of the A3 motorway between Salerno and Reggio di Calabria which is operated by the government-owned A.N.A.S. S.p.A. Both are toll free.

Since Italian motorways form a network, the toll price is proportional to the distance traveled. To let the system calculate how much the toll is, the motorist has to withdraw a ticket from an automatic dealer before entering the motorway, returning it at the toll gate on exit. If a user loses the entry ticket prior to exiting the motorway, the toll assessed will be calculated from the most distant motorway access road accessible via the same route unless the user can prove by documentary evidence (hotel invoices, petrol receipts etc.) to have entered the motorway at another access. If the vehicle is equipped with a Telepass OBU (an automatic toll collection device) the ticket should not be picked up.

However, there are many exceptions: on some motorways (such as A8 and A9) the toll is collected in another way. One or more toll gates ( barriere) are placed along the route, where a fixed charge (depending on the vehicle's size) is collected, regardless of the distance traveled to get there. This alternate system is called open system ( sistema aperto).

Tolls can be paid in cash, by credit card, by pre-paid card, or by Telepass, a system comparable to E-ZPass.

Motorways are named AXX, where XX is a number. Numbers from 1 to 33 generally designate autostrade which are not beltways but may be parts of them (for example, one section of the A4 which is a part of the Milan beltway), while numbers from 50 to 91 designate beltways around larger cities. The A1, for example, connects Milan to Naples, the A50, A51, and A52 are part of the Milan beltway. Many motorways have nicknames ("Autostrada del Sole" meaning "Sun Highway" for the A1). The numbers have not been allocated methodically.

61% of the Autostrade are handled by the "Autostrade per l'Italia S.p.A." company, and its subsidiaries. All of these carriers are now privately owned and supervised by ANAS. The network of motorways covers most of Italy: northern and central Italy are well covered, the south and Sicily are scarcely covered, Sardinia is not covered at all.

The motorway operators are required to build, operate and maintain their networks at cost and to cover their expenses from the toll they collect. The tolls vary according to the building and maintenance costs of the motorway and the type of vehicle. Consequently, tolls can be expensive. For example, the typical Milan-Naples route of around 700 km costs approximately €40. There are additional toll roads in Italy in the urban areas of Venice and Florence where tourist buses must pay a fee to enter the city.

Besides the motorways, only some alpine tunnels (such as the Mont Blanc Tunnel) are tolled. Almost all other Italian roads and highways, including motorway-like dual carriageways ( superstrade) are toll-free, exceptions being the Superstrada Pedemontana Veneta (in construction) and few other places like Zovo Tunnel, on provincial road 134 in Veneto.

North Macedonia 

Highways in North Macedonia which have been upgraded to avtopat standard are toll roads and they use a ticket system.

Norway 

Norway has a sixty-year experience in road tolling for financing bridges, tunnels and roads. Until the beginning of the 1980s contributions of tolls to the road building budget stagnated at about 5%, since then it has soared to more than 25% in 2000. Those twenty years were marked by the advance of road tolling in urban areas.

Norwegian authorities closely monitored Singapore's use of tolls as a means to discourage urban traffic and Bergen got its first toll zone outside the ring road on 1 February 1986. Any driver wishing to enter central Bergen by car had to pay the fee. In difference to the project in Singapore, the tolls in Norway are by law not meant as a means for regulating traffic but rather only as one for generating income to be invested in infrastructure. The lack of general protest and high income from such toll zones made them very popular initially and today toll rings circumscribe Oslo, Stavanger, Tønsberg, Namsos and Kristiansand. The toll ring in Trondheim was closed December 30, 2005 after 14 years in operation. However, after voters elected a socialist city council it was reintroduced in 2014 - though there's a slight possibility entering the city from the west where few people reside, via a major detour. Toll roads around major cities are permanent, financing to a large extent non-road related infrastructure, like subsidizing subways or bike paths. While in rural areas they are normally of temporary nature to finance the building of the road. Often tolls are introduced on old roads, before the new roads are built - especially in the Oslo region.

There are also several toll roads to finance road infrastructure and highways in other parts of Norway. An example of successful use is the bridge over lake Mjøsa which is now free of charge. A map of all public toll roads in Norway are available on the Autopass website. The site also allows payment after passing a toll without the normal electronic badge. The Brobizz badge from Denmark works in Norway's Autopass system.

Poland 
Only highways in Poland levy charges on vehicles. There are two systems: open and closed (see: Toll Roads). A toll systems operate on the following highways:
 A1—only section Gdańsk—Toruń is payable
 A2—section between Rzepin and Poznań and section Poznań—Stryków
 A4—section between Wrocław and Gliwice and section Katowice—Kraków
A toll is collected electronically from vans, trucks and buses. All other highways are free of charge as they do not meet all present-day requirements or are parts of Ring roads.

Portugal 
In Portugal a certain number of roads are designated Toll-Roads. They charge a fixed value per kilometre distance, with several classes depending on vehicle type and regulated by the government. Several authorised franchises run them, the largest at present being BRISA. Other operators are AEA, Ascendi and Lusoponte.

Some motorways operate a cash-free Via Verde system (Portuguese for Green Way) which is an electronic tag that is fitted to vehicles and automatically debits an associated bank-account with the cost of the journey made. To use these motorways foreign cars will need to buy a pre-paid pass, for 3 or 5 days or link their bank account to the system or buy a pre-paid toll card that uses a text message to link it to your vehicle registration number.

Well-known roads are the A1, which goes from Lisbon to Porto and the A2, from Almada to the Algarve, or the A6, from the A2 at Marateca to the Spanish border, close to Badajoz.

Russia 
A number of toll roads in Barnaul and Pskov Region (Nevil-Velezh (RUR 190 ($2.8)), Pechori-state border RUR 140($2,1)), also M4-Don (18 km close to Lipetsk costs RUR20($0,3) for cars and RUR40 ($0,6) for trucks).

Ordinary speed limits apply so far. In 2007 adopted Toll Road Law and Concession Law in 2005 to develop this sector.

Spain 
Spanish toll roads (or autopistas) are designated AP-XX (where XX is the number of the road) as opposed to State-maintained dual carriage-ways (or autovías), called A-XX. Most of them are networked, so a ticket is issued on entering and the fee is paid when leaving the road. Technically, all the roads belong to the Government, although autopistas are built and maintained by private companies under a State concession; when the concession expires, the road reverts to State ownership, although most of them are renewed.

There are some autovías which are built and maintained by private companies, notably the Pamplona-Logroño autovía A-12; the company assumes the building costs and the Autonomous Community where they are located (in the given example, Navarre) pays a yearly per-vehicle fee to the company based upon usage statistics, called "toll in the shadow" (in Spanish, peaje en la sombra). The system can be regarded as a way for the Government to finance the build of new roads at the expense of the building company. Also, since the payment starts only after the road is finished, construction delays are usually shorter than those of regular state-owned dual carriage-ways.

Sweden 

The border-crossing The Oresund Bridge (opened 2000) and Svinesund Bridge (opened 2003) have tolls. The Sundsvall Bridge (opened 2014) is a domestic toll bridge, the first for a very long time. Before year 2000 road tolls did not exist in Sweden for several decades.

The Stockholm congestion tax was introduced in 2006 to reduce traffic congestion in Stockholm during peak hours. Later in 2013 the Gothenburg congestion tax was also introduced. There are no toll-booths. Instead, vehicles passing into or out of central Stockholm between 06:30 and 18:30 on weekdays are identified by an automatic number plate recognition system and the owners of applicable vehicles are billed on a monthly basis.

Switzerland 
Switzerland uses a Vignette system similar to Austria for private vehicles. All domestic and foreign users of motorways need to purchase such a sticker and put it on the windshield according to instructions. Only an annual sticker is available, which currently costs CHF 40, (around 34 Euros as of 20.11.2017) and allows for unlimited travel on the motorway network of the country during the calendar year. The sticker can be purchased at gas stations along the border and other convenience shops in the country. Use of motorway networks without a valid vignette is an offense against the Public Highways Act, and is punishable with cash fines of CHF 200 or more, in addition to the obligatory purchase of an annual vignette.
 
As for trucks and lorries a performance-related heavy vehicle fee (HVF) was introduced in Switzerland on 1 January 2001. This fee replaces the flat-rate heavy vehicle charge that had been levied since 1985 and is based on a law approved by a clear majority of the electorate in September 1998.

The HVF must be paid on all Swiss and foreign vehicles (i.e. those registered outside Switzerland) used for freight transport whose total maximum permitted weight exceeds 3.5 tonnes. It is levied on all public roads in Switzerland.

The amount charged is based on the mileage covered, the total maximum permitted weight and the emission rating (Euro class) of the vehicle in question.

The mileage covered within Switzerland is read off the tachograph that is fitted in almost all vehicles which are subject to the fee. A fee is not charged separately for trailers but in conjunction with the tractor unit. In this case, the rate is calculated according to tariffs for maximum permitted weight on Swiss roads. This maximum permitted weight may be lower than the sum of the maximum total weight of the tractor unit and the trailer since it depends on the type of tractor unit and is subject to the general national weight limit. The national weight limit is 40 tonnes.

The person who is liable for the fee has at the same time a duty to cooperate. Swiss transport companies regularly declare the mileage covered by their vehicles to the Directorate General of Customs. In the case of foreign vehicles, the mileage is automatically declared at the customs post upon leaving Switzerland. The fee is then either paid direct when the driver leaves the country or charged to an account in the transport company's name.

The owner of the vehicle (and in the case of foreign vehicles the driver too) is responsible for ensuring that the declaration made is correct. Equally, he is responsible for ensuring that the recording device is in good working order. This is also part of the principle of obligatory cooperation on the part of persons who are subject to the fee.

No distance-related fee is levied on heavy vehicles used to transport passengers, i.e. buses and coaches, for which a flat-rate charge is levied. Certain vehicles (military vehicles, police vehicles, fire brigade vehicles, etc.) are exempt from the fee.

The system for levying HVF is implemented by the customs administration in conjunction with cantonal highways offices, transport companies and authorised assembly points.

The Swiss authorities invested some CHF 290 million to set up the HVF system. This sum included development (toll system, recording device, etc.), procuring and installing the necessary roadside infrastructure (beacons and associated equipment) and procuring the recording devices.

The annual cost of operation, maintenance and additional staff constitutes around 7-8% of the total, which is relatively low in comparison with other electronic toll systems.

Turkey 
In Turkey, a toll is collected on certain highways, the so-called Otoyol or Otoban. The beltways around major cities (çevreyolu), even though they are classified as highways are generally toll-free. Payment for toll-road has been done by three different systems. Every tollgate had lanes for all three payment methods. The KGS method (English: Card passage system) which required a Prepaid card to be presented at the tollgate. Every passing will be withdrawn from the card. However since January 2013 KGS cards have ceased to be valid. The HGS method (English: Fast passage system) uses a RFID chip stuck to the windshield of the vehicle. This chip is scanned automatically when passing the toll collecting point and the fee is automatically withdrawn from the connected bank account. The OGS method (English:Automatic passage system), requires a fixed amount of money to be paid for a monthly or annual subscription. When subscribed, a barcode is affixed to the vehicle, which is scanned by CCTV cameras automatically to check for a valid subscription. The Turkish toll system cannot be avoided (except for avoiding toll roads), because due to the cameras, all vehicles without OGS or HGS registrations, or with missing or invalid chips is issued with a fine to the registered postal home address.

Toll fees can vary greatly on Turkish highways, depending on how they were built and are operated. While the Istanbul-Ankara highway, built during the 1980s and is fully state-owned will cost 30,00 TL to travel one direction, the newly built and privately operated Istanbul-Izmir highway will cost 367,00 TL for passengers vehicles as of September 2021. Similarly, the intercontinental Bosphorus crossings over Istanbul's two suspension bridges (the Bosphorus Bridge and the Fatih Sultan Mehmet Bridge) costs 13,35 TL, while the newly built Çanakkale 1915 Bridge over the Dardanelles Strait is expected to cost over 150,00 TL.

United Kingdom 

In the 18th century and 19th century most main roads in Great Britain were managed as toll roads, by turnpike trusts, but these were gradually abolished in the 1860s and 1870s.

As a result, until recently, the only tolls on roads in the United Kingdom were mainly tolled bridges and tunnels at estuaries (e.g. Humber Bridge, Severn crossing, Mersey Tunnels and Tyne Tunnel) and some small, privately owned toll roads and bridges (for example, in Dulwich College).

The recently built and privately financed M6 Toll, opened in 2003, is potentially the first of a new generation of toll roads.

There are three places in the UK with congestion charges; London has the peak-time London congestion charge, Durham has a similar charge on a much smaller scale and in 2002 a congestion charge was implemented on the Dartford Crossing.

In principle, UK roads today are maintained from general taxation, some of which is raised from motoring taxes including fuel duty and vehicle excise duty.

See also 
 Toll road
 Electronic toll collection
 TELEPASS (Italy)
 High-occupancy toll lane
 Freeway
 List of toll roads
 London congestion charge
 Private highway
 Road pricing
 Toll bridge
 Turnpike trusts the first organisations empowered to collect tolls on English roads
 Road Transport
 Vignette (road tax)

References

External links 
National Alliance Against Tolls (British anti toll group, but "News" pages includes the US and other countries.)
Autoroutes (France) French site that will give estimates for tolls payable between different points in Europe
Toll stickers in Slovakia Information on toll sticker types and toll roads in Slovakia.
Hungarian Highways English language site of the Hungarian Highway Authority
Overview of European Tolling Systems
Information about BelToll in English
Vignette Identification

Europe
Car costs